Boy Meets Boy is an American reality television series broadcast by Bravo. The six-episode series premiered on July 29, 2003, and concluded on September 2, 2003. Filmed in Palm Springs, California, the series followed James Getzlaff, a 32-year-old human resources manager, in search of a partner among a group of fifteen men. Getzlaff participated in a series of one-on-one dates and group activities with the men, in which he would eliminate three men every episode. In the fourth episode, however, Getzlaff was informed that the group consisted of both gay and straight men. If Getzlaff's final choice among the group was a gay man, he would win a $25,000 reward and a vacation to New Zealand. Conversely, if Getzlaff chose a straight man, then the man alone would win the $25,000 reward. The series was hosted by English television presenter Dani Behr.

Boy Meets Boy received mixed reception from television critics. Some critics believed it was entertaining to speculate on the men's sexual orientations, while others criticized the twist against Getzlaff as cruel. The series premiered to 1.6 million viewers and maintained high ratings throughout its short-lived run. A second season was considered by Bravo and the series's producers, although they found difficulty in developing a different twist that would be as captivating to audiences. Boy Meets Boy was the first same-sex dating show and it inspired a wave of LGBT-themed reality television series in the 2000s. In 2022, Time deemed the first and only season of Boy Meets Boy as one of the most influential reality television seasons of all time.

Format

Set in Palm Springs, California, the series depicted James Getzlaff, a 32-year-old human resources manager, selecting a partner among a group of fifteen men (referred to as "mates"). The fifteen men were required to move into a house together, in which they went on one-on-one dates with Getzlaff and competed in a variety of group activities. At the end of each episode, Getzlaff eliminated three men from the competition. In determining which men to send home, Getzlaff consulted with his longtime friend Andra Stasko, a married straight woman. Toward the end of the series, Getzlaff was informed that the group of men actually consisted of both gay and straight men. If the man Getzlaff chose at the end of the competition was gay, the two would win a vacation to New Zealand and Getzlaff would receive a $25,000 reward. Conversely, if Getzlaff chose a straight man, the straight man alone would win the $25,000 reward while Getzlaff would receive a "very small" cash reward. English television personality Dani Behr served as the host of the series.

Production
The series was filmed in May 2003 in Palm Springs, California. Over 500 men from San Francisco, Los Angeles, and San Diego were interviewed for a potential role in the series. Getzlaff originally interviewed for the role of a suitor, although producers ultimately offered him the leading role. As the leading man, Getzlaff was required to bring his "best female friend" to offer him guidance as he eliminated suitors. According to executive producer Douglas Ross, "[w]e very specifically designed this show to challenge the viewer's preconceived notions about what it means to be gay and straight. We really wanted it to be an exploration of sexual politics and not sex." While the producers were interested in exploring "sociological issues", the twist of some contestants being straight was implemented in an effort for the series to reach broader audiences. In order to protect the identities of which suitors were gay and straight, any physicality between Getzlaff and suitors beyond kissing was forbidden.

The series premiered July 29, 2003, on the Bravo cable television channel.

Contestants

Episodes

Potential second season
Boy Meets Boy creator Doug Ross held out hope for a second season. He acknowledged that the popularity of season one would make it practically impossible for another season with the same twist but also said that he has come up with another twist which Bravo executives thought was fun. Speaking in 2007, Bravo executive Frances Berwick pointed to public knowledge of the twist as a stumbling block to a second season, noting the difficulty Bravo had selling the series overseas because of international press reports on the twist. On the possibility of a season two with a new twist, Berwick said, "What Bravo does best is to do things first and to really sort of shake up people's preconceptions and notions about things. And we would accept many different formats [for a Boy Meets Boy-type show]. I'm not saying that they wouldn't be as good, because you can always come up with something else. [But] until we find the perfect way to do it..." Berwick also suggested that at the time a series as gay-specific as Boy Meets Boy might not have fit into Bravo's overall programming strategy. "It has to feel like it's broad enough, and multidimensional enough to work for our incredibly smart audience."

Home media
The entire six episode series was released to DVD as a box set in the United States on May 25, 2004.  In addition to containing all six episodes, the DVD set includes additional interviews and footage with behind the scenes featurettes, casting reels, performances by Miss Coco Peru, the original unaired opening sequence, cast biographies, and a "Where Are They Now?" segment with updates on some of the participants.

Legacy
Boy Meets Boy was the first same-sex dating show. Despite its short-lived run, the series was responsible for a wave of LGBT-related reality television series in the mid-2000s, including Playing It Straight, Gay, Straight or Taken?, and Straight Dates by Gay Mates. In 2022, Time cited the first and only season of Boy Meets Boy as one of the most influential reality television seasons of all time.

See also

 Playing It Straight
 Gay, Straight or Taken?

References

External links
  at the Wayback Machine
 

2000s American LGBT-related television series
2000s American reality television series
2003 American television series debuts
2003 American television series endings
2000s LGBT-related reality television series
American dating and relationship reality television series
American LGBT-related reality television series
Bravo (American TV network) original programming
English-language television shows
Gay-related television shows
Television series by Evolution Film & Tape
Television shows set in Palm Springs, California